Oslyanka is a mountain in Russia. With an elevation of 1,119 m, it is the highest point of Middle Ural. Oslyanka is located in northeastern Kizelovsky District, Perm Krai, Russia. It lies to the north of Basegi mountain range and to southeast of Mount Nyarovsky Kamen.  There are several tops with conical shapes located in the central part of the mountain, with buttes dominating the northern side. In elevations less 750 – 800 m, the slopes are covered by coniferous forests.

External links 
Oslyanka in encyclopedia of Perm Krai

Mountains of Perm Krai